Zazacatla is a pre-Columbian archaeological site of Mesoamerica's central Mexican plateau region, in Xochitepec, dating to the mid-Formative period of Mesoamerican chronology. The site was first excavated in 2006 underneath a modern commercial and housing development site, some 13 km (8.1 mi) south of Cuernavaca, capital of the Mexican state of Morelos, and 40 km (25 mi) south of Mexico City. Initial investigations by archaeologists from Mexico's National Institute of Anthropology and History (INAH) reported finding evidence of Olmec cultural influences at the site, the first such known for the western Morelos region.

Site description
A fraction of Zazacatla's ceremonial center has been investigated, amounting to some 9,000 m² (approx. 2.2 acres) of excavations. The total area of the site is estimated to occupy some 2.5 km², or slightly less than one square mile.

Zazacatla's occupation is dated to between 800—500  BCE, making it roughly contemporary with the Olmec center of La Venta, 400 km (250 mi) to the east.  Several sculptures of what appear to be Olmec-style "priests" have been uncovered.  These sculptures, as well as Olmec-style architecture, have led to speculation on the role that Olmec culture played in Zazacatla.

Archaeologist Giselle Canto told Associated Press that the inhabitants adopted Olmec styles when they changed from a simpler egalitarian society to a more complex hierarchical one:

In January 2007 the governor of Morelos, Marco Adame Castillo, announced an offer for the state to underwrite the preservation of the site and to incorporate it into the tourism and cultural heritage plans for Morelos. He foreshadowed that a tourism project would be initiated at the site's location once the archaeological investigations had further developed.

Notes

See also
Olmec influences on Mesoamerican cultures
Tlatilco
Tlapacoya

References

 
 
 
 
  Also available as Gale General OneFile document number A158381284.

External links
 Olmec-Style Effigies from Zazacatla, photographs by Jorge Pérez de Lara, reproduced at Mesoweb
 Photo of the Olmec-style sculptures—note the downturned mouths.

Archaeological sites in Morelos
Mesoamerican sites
Olmec sites
Former populated places in Mexico